Lisa Rüedi (born 3 November 2000) is a Swiss ice hockey player and member of the Swiss national team, currently playing in the Swiss Women's League (SWHL A) with the ZSC Lions Frauen. She served as captain of the ZSC Lions during the 2020–21 season, during which the team won the Swiss Women's Cup, and the 2021–22 season, in which the Lions were SWHL A champions.

Rüedi represented Switzerland in the women's ice hockey tournament at the 2018 Winter Olympics in PyeongChang, the women's ice hockey tournament at the 2022 Winter Olympics in Beijing, and at the IIHF Women's World Championships in 2017, 2019, 2021, and 2022. As a junior player with the Swiss national under-18 team, she participated in the IIHF U18 Women's World Championship in 2015, 2016, 2017, and 2018. At the 2016 Winter Youth Olympics in Lillehammer, she won a bronze medal in the girls' ice hockey tournament with the Swiss under-16 team.

References

External links
 
 

2000 births
Living people
Ice hockey players at the 2018 Winter Olympics
Ice hockey players at the 2022 Winter Olympics
Ice hockey players at the 2016 Winter Youth Olympics
Olympic ice hockey players of Switzerland
Sportspeople from Graubünden
Swiss women's ice hockey forwards
Swiss Women's League players
Youth Olympic bronze medalists for Switzerland